Something to Live For is the fourth studio album by Nigerian singer Phyno. It was released on November 12, 2021.

Background
The 16-track album has a running time of fifty-five minutes and it features Flavour, the Cavemen, Olamide, D Smoke, Peruzzi, Jay Teazer, J Dess, Bee Pee, Pappy Kojo and Anjulite. The production was handled by Chillz, Rexxie, Masterkraft, Ransombeatz, Blaq Jerzee, TYMG, Eli, Runcheck, Marvie, Soularge and Flengy. Swaps, STG, MixMonster, Exraordinaire and Jaysynths did the mix and master.

Singles 
On July 9, 2021, Phyno released "Bia" alongside its video as a single off the album.

Reception 

Motolani Alake of Pulse Nigeria described the album as Phyno's exercise in grown topics around gratitude, his journey, love, loss, braggadocio and more. Also noting that the album is too long at 16 tracks and 55 minutes, and that "Paracetamol", "Love Me Right" and "Bia" were not needed. The album was rated 6.1/10 at the end.

Joy Dennis of Naijaloaded rated the album 7/10, adding that the album is something the industry has missed and "It's a breath of fresh air".

Track listing

References 

2021 albums
Phyno albums
Igbo highlife albums
Igbo-language albums